Neogea is a genus of orb-weaver spiders first described by Herbert Walter Levi in 1983.  it contains only three species.

References

Araneidae
Araneomorphae genera
Spiders of Asia